Neskowin Beach State Recreation Site is a state park in Tillamook County, Oregon, United States, administered by the Oregon Parks and Recreation Department.

See also

List of Oregon state parks
Neskowin Ghost Forest
Neskowin, Oregon

References

External links
 

State parks of Oregon
Beaches of Oregon
Parks in Tillamook County, Oregon
Landforms of Tillamook County, Oregon